Pungarabato   is one of the 81 municipalities of Guerrero, in south-western Mexico. The municipal seat lies at Ciudad Altamirano. As of 2005, the municipality had a total population of 36,466.

References 

Municipalities of Guerrero